is a 2011 Japanese film directed by Ryuta Tasaki.

Cast
 Mitsuki Tanimura as Maisu/Salvage Mice
 Julia Nagano as Mio Usagi
 Kai Shishido
 Yuki Sato
 Seiya Osada
 Maxwell Powers as the voice of Mob Boss

See also
Unofficial Sentai Akibaranger - A TV series also directed by Ryuta Tasaki, featuring a cameo appearance by Mio Usagi.

References

External links
 Official website 
 

2011 films
Films directed by Ryuta Tasaki
Films set in Hiroshima
Films shot in Hiroshima
Japanese martial arts films
Tokusatsu films
2011 martial arts films
2010s Japanese films